Sphingomonas pruni  is a bacterium from the genus of Sphingomonas which has been isolated from the roots of the tree Prunus persica in Japan
.

References

Further reading

External links
Type strain of Sphingomonas pruni at BacDive -  the Bacterial Diversity Metadatabase	

pruni
Bacteria described in 1995